Elijah Bernard Jordan (born June 11, 1959) better known as E. Bernard Jordan, is an American television evangelist, founder of Zoe Ministries, and writer of books on prosperity theology.

Jordan grew up in Brooklyn's Bedford-Stuyvesant area and believed he received his calling through a dream when he was 15 years of age.  When he was 23 years of age he founded the Zoe Ministries in New York City. Jordan studied at the Tabernacle Bible Institute in Brooklyn and the Manhattan Bible Institute.  Jordan received a purported Ph.D. from Friends International Christian University, an unaccredited mail order and online university. He also briefly attended Kepler College, an uncredited online, certificate granting institution, pursuing a degree in astrology. In 2019, Jordan earned a Master of Divinity degree from Samuel DeWitt Proctor School of Theology at Virginia Union University, a historical Black College and University.

Jordan was raised to the bishopric in 1994 by Roy E. Brown of the Pilgrim Assemblies International denomination.

The first edition of Jordan's The Laws of Thinking made the New York Times Best Seller List in 2007.

Prosperity ministry 
Initially Zoe Ministry services were conducted in a member's home, then in several New York City hotels before they were held in a theatre.  His "Power of Prophecy" television show aired from 1991 to about 1997, when it became too expensive to maintain.  His ministry is based upon the premise that if one sows money, such as contributions to his ministry, they will reap prosperity for themselves.  In his book God is Not a Christian, Nor a Jew, Muslim, Hindu..., Carlton Pearson references Jordan's discussion of the inner spiritual divine as the essence of who we are, rather than our physical body as Jordan described in  his book The Laws of Thinking.

Chicago Mayor Richard M. Daley honored Jordan for his ministerial work in 2007. Al Sharpton is numbered as one of his friends and he has celebrity mentees, such as Joseph "Reverend Run" Simmons of Run-DMC and MTV's Run's House, having named him "Protege of the Year Award" in 2004.  The same day, symbolic of his "Prosperity Ministry", there was a "Rolls-Royce parade outside the Plaza Hotel in New York City, " featuring Jordan's Phantom Rolls-Royce.  The new  $325,000 Phantom had been a gift from Reverend Run as a "thank you" for his mentoring support.

Although he lives a life of luxury, he is sometimes dressed in a black, hooded robe, such as at Zoe Ministries retreats in Woodbourne, New York in the Catskill Mountains.

Family 
Jordan lived with his wife Debra and five children in a gated community, Tuxedo Park in Orange County, New York. Jordan now resides in a 26,000 square foot mansion in Saddle River, New Jersey. Jordan was connected with Reverend Frederick J. Eikerenkoetter II ("Reverend Ike"), a radio and television preacher who preached prosperity and "positive self-image psychology", who died in 2009.

Criticisms 
Critics of Jordan's work question his being labeled a "prophet" and question the monetary pledges for spiritual enlightenment.

Lawsuits
A federal judge entered a default judgement against Jordan in 2019. This followed a year-long failure by Jordan to respond to a class suit action by Jeffrey Molitor who complained of robocalls from the ministry.

In a separate case in 2018, an Ohio woman also sued for compensation and punitive damages due to unauthorized robocalls and text messages from Manasseh Jordan Ministries. A corporation that provided phone services was sued  Additional lawsuits have been filed in California.

Published works
This is a partial list of Jordan's published works:
 1973 - 10 Things Americans Wish They Had Known and 7 Things They Have to Know
 1992 - The Power of Money
 1994 - Spiritual Protocol
 1995 - Keys to Liberation
 1995 - The Power of the Dime
 1995 - What Every Woman Should Know About Men
 1995 - Written Judgements Volumes 1-4. Zoe Ministries, Inc.
 1996 - The Achiever's Guide to Success
 1996 - His Color Was Black: A Race Attack
 1996 - The Spirit Of Liberation
 2005 - "Cosmic Universe: The Universal Keys to Wealth"
 2008 - The Laws of Thinking: 20 Secrets to Using the Divine Power of Your Mind to Manifest Prosperity. is a book that explains 20 Laws that govern God's operation on this earthly plane. Spanish version. French version.
 2008 - The Business of Getting Rich (12 Secrets to Unveiling the Spiritual Side of Wealth In You).
 2009 - Beyond the Laws of Thinking
 2011 - The Laws of Prosperity

See also 
 Reverend Ike
 Joseph Simmons, Reverend Run

References

External links 
 E. Bernard Jordan official site
 About E. Bernard Jordan
 Church Official Site

African-American television personalities
American television evangelists
Prosperity theologians
Living people
1959 births
21st-century African-American people
20th-century African-American people